KTPH may refer to:

 KTPH (FM), a radio station (91.7 FM) licensed to Tonopah, Nevada, United States
 The ICAO code for Tonopah Airport near Tonopah, Nevada, United States
 Khoo Teck Puat Hospital, a hospital in Yishun, Singapore